Ambolotarakely  is a municipality in Analamanga Region, in the  Central Highlands of Madagascar, located in the North from the capital of Antananarivo.  Ambolotarakely is situated in Ankazobe, Antananarivo, Madagascar, its geographical coordinates are 18° 16' 0" South, 47° 24' 0" East. 

Nearby is situated the Ambohitantely Reserve. The unique feature identifier is: 198572 and the unique name identifier is:300096.

Places near Ambolotarakely 
Cities, towns and places near Ambolotarakely include:  

 Antananarivo
 Toamasina
 Nacala
 Nampula

 Antsahamalaza
 Ankofa
 Fenoarivo
 Vohibolo.

References
mapcarta.com/fr/W32763349 mapcarta

Populated places in Analamanga